Monkey rope is a common name for several plants and may refer to:

 Dalbergia armata, a species in the family Fabaceae native to Africa
 Parsonsia straminea, a species in the family Apocynaceae native to Australia